The Arizona Corporation Commission is the Public Utilities Commission of the State of Arizona, established by Article 15 of the Arizona Constitution. Arizona is one of only fourteen states with elected commissioners. The Arizona Constitution explicitly calls for an elected commission, as opposed to a governor-appointed commission, which is the standard in most states, because its drafters feared that governors would appoint industry-friendly officials. They are directly elected statewide and serve staggered four-year terms. Due to its separation from the executive branch, the commission is often referred to as the "fourth branch of government." The characterization of the Commission as the "fourth branch of government" is contradicted, however, by Article III of the Arizona Constitution, which provides that "[t]he powers of the government of the state of Arizona shall be divided into three separate departments, the legislative, the executive, and the judicial".

The commission has five members. , the commissioners are Lea Márquez Peterson, Nick Myers, Jim O'Connor, Kevin Thompson, and Anna Tovar.

Responsibilities and duties
The commission's scope of responsibility is generally larger than most commissions in other states.  Some of its major duties include regulating public utility companies, regulating the incorporation of businesses and organizations, securities regulation, and railroad/pipeline safety.

In January 2018, Former Speaker of the Arizona House of Representatives and Commissioner Andy Tobin proposed an energy plan that includes an 80 percent clean energy target and a 3,000 MW energy storage procurement target, which would surpass California and New York.

Leadership
The current Chairperson of the Arizona Corporation Commission is Jim O'Connor.

Prior to January 5, 2016, the chairman was Susan Bitter Smith. She joined the commission in 2013.

As of 2015, the Arizona Attorney General’s office began investigating a complaint that seeks to have Bitter Smith removed from her position due to conflict-of-interest issues. As chair of the commission, Bitter Smith is in charge of regulating the telecommunications industry. However, at the same time, she was a lobbyist for the industry, running her own public relations firm called Technical Solutions. Until recently, the company described itself on its website as a “full service government affairs company including direct federal, state and local lobbying activities with agencies ranging from the Federal Communications Commission, to the Arizona Corporation Commission, to the Arizona Legislature and Arizona municipalities.” The description from Technical Solution's website was removed after the Arizona Attorney General began investigating the complaint against her.

An attorney with the Arizona Corporation Commission, Eric Hill, quit his position in June 2016 and began a new job representing rooftop solar companies such as SolarCity at the Scottsdale, Arizona-based Rose Law Group. The law firm represented solar companies in legal battles between solar companies and the Arizona Public Services Company (APS), which is the largest and oldest electric company in Arizona. The legal battles were about net metering; the two sides argued over how much electric rates should be and how much refunds should be to homeowners running rooftop solar panels.

Hearing Division
The Hearing Division, under the supervision of the Chief Hearing Officer, conducts evidentiary hearings and issues recommended orders for the Commissioners' consideration and approval.  Chief Hearing Officers, since creation of the position, have been:
 1974–1975: Lawrence J. Evans, Jr.
 1975–1979: Andrew Wilson Bettwy
 1979–1981: David Kennedy
 1982–1987: Thomas Mumaw
 1987–1992: Beth Ann Burns
 1992–2000: Jerry Rudibaugh
 2000–?: Jane Rodda (Acting)
 2009–2015: Lyn Farmer
 2015–present: Dwight Nodes

Regulation of public utilities
As part of its role in regulating public utilities, the Commission established a Renewable Energy Standard and Tariff (REST) in 2006. To provide public information related to implementation of the REST, the Commission together with the regulated electric utilities in Arizona have developed a website called Arizona Goes Solar. The authority for the Commission to establish a renewable energy standard has been challenged several times in court by the Goldwater Institute (see Miller v. Arizona Corporation Commission). The standard was most recently upheld by the Arizona Court of Appeals in April 2011.

Current commissioners
Current Corporation Commissioners  are Lea Márquez Peterson (R), Nick Myers (R), Jim O’Connor (R) (Chair), Kevin Thompson (R), and Anna Tovar (D).

See also
 List of company registers

References

External links
 

Corporation
Arizona
Registrars of companies
State constitutional officers of Arizona